= Constituency PSW-133 =

Reserved constituency of the Provincial Assembly of Sindh, Pakistan

PSW-133
- Provincial Reserved constituency for the Provincial Assembly of Sindh

Current constituency

PSW-133 is a Constituency of the Provincial Assembly of Sindh.

== See also ==
- Sindh
